The Macdaniel affair or Macdaniel scandal was a political scandal in the United Kingdom.  In 1754, a group of bounty hunters, led by Stephen MacDaniel, were revealed to have been prosecuting innocent men to their deaths in England in order to collect reward money from bounties. The scandal was an unintended consequence of the British government offering rewards for the capture of criminals, as before those rewards were instituted, thief-takers depended primarily on privately funded rewards from victims seeking return of stolen property or other restitution. The Macdaniel affair formed part of the impetus for the formation of salaried public police forces, who did not depend on rewards, to combat crime in the country.

References

Further reading
 Hitchcock, Tim and Robert Shoemaker. London Lives.  Cambridge, UK: Cambridge University Press, 2015.
 Ward, Richard M. Print Culture, Crime and Justice in 18th-Century London History of Crime, Deviance and Punishment.  London, UK: Bloomsbury Publishing, 2014.

Crime in England
English criminal law
1754 in England
1754 crimes
1754 in British law